In enzymology, a homoglutathione synthase is an enzyme that catalyzes the chemical reaction

ATP + γ-L-glutamyl-L-cysteine + β-alanine  ADP + phosphate + γ-Lglutamyl-L-cysteinyl-β-alanine

The 3 substrates of this enzyme are ATP, gamma-L-glutamyl-L-cysteine, and beta-alanine, whereas its 3 products are ADP, phosphate, and gamma-L-glutamyl-L-cysteinyl-beta-alanine.

This enzyme belongs to the family of ligases, specifically those forming carbon-nitrogen bonds as acid-D-amino-acid ligases (peptide synthases).  The systematic name of this enzyme class is gamma-L-glutamyl-L-cysteine:beta-alanine ligase (ADP-forming). Other names in common use include homoglutathione synthetase, and beta-alanine specific hGSH synthetase.

References

 

EC 6.3.2
Enzymes of unknown structure